Liz Evora (born November 30) is a Cuban-born naturalized American broadcast journalist. She is currently a news reporter and producer for InfoMás.

Early years
Evora began her career in Havana, Cuba as a child, starring in theatre plays. In 2003, she moved with her family to the United States.

In 2006, Evora attended Miami Dade College in Miami, studying mass communication. A year later, she transferred to the University of Miami, where she graduated in 2010 with a bachelor's degree in broadcast journalism and political science and a minor in communication studies. At "The U," she anchored and reported for the University of Miami's Spanish news magazine, UniMiami and interned with Univision 23, WLTV-DT, where she helped cover news on crime, education, immigration, politics, and the 2010 World Cup.

Television news
In 2010, Evora joined Telemundo Amarillo, where she serves as anchor and producer of the 5pm daily newscast.

On the Spring of 2011 she moved to Tampa, where she worked as a reporter for Bay News 9 in Español, a fast-paced 24 hours news cable channel. A few months later, she became a reporter for the new regional channel InfoMás following the merger of Bay News 9 en Español and Central Florida News en Español. During that time, she contributed reports for the weekday newscasts and produce for the weekend editions and covered stories like the Republican convention in Tampa and the last presidential debate in Boca Raton. In 2012, she produced a documentary about Cuban society for the first anniversary of the station.

Other Work
In English, she produced and directed, "The Greatest Commodity in the World..." a short documentary film on one of Miami's marginalized neighborhoods, Overtown, revealing the frustration and ill-feelings of the residents towards media coverage of that area.

Documentaries

"The Greatest Commodity in the World..." (2010) short documentary of Miami's Overtown
"Cuba, de Regreso a Casa" (2012) documentary about Cuban society

Non Profit
Liz has helped raise funds for the St. Jude Children's Research Hospital at the La Mejor radio station marathon in Amarillo, Texas. During the 2010 mid-term elections, she volunteered in a mostly Latin district as a Spanish interpreter. Evora also is a member of the National Association of Hispanic Journalists (NAHJ).

References

External links
 Noticiero Telemundo Amarillo (Spanish) 
 https://web.archive.org/web/20130730030917/http://www.baynews9.com/content/news/baynews9/news/espanol/bios/liz-evora.html

Year of birth missing (living people)
Cuban emigrants to the United States
Cuban journalists
Cuban women journalists
American television news anchors
Living people
University of Miami alumni
American women television journalists
Naturalized citizens of the United States
21st-century American women